Albert Yarullin (born May 12, 1993) is a Russian professional ice hockey defenceman who is currently playing under contract with Traktor Chelyabinsk of the Kontinental Hockey League (KHL).

Playing career
Yarullin originally played with Ak Bars Kazan in the KHL during the 2011–12 season.

Yarullin spent parts of two seasons with HC Neftekhimik Nizhnekamsk and Atlant Moscow Oblast before returning to Ak Bars in a trade prior to the 2015–16 season on June 3, 2015.

Following his ninth season in the KHL with Ak Bars in 2020–21, Yarullin left the club as a free agent to sign a three-year contract with Traktor Chelyabinsk on 13 May 2021.

Awards and honours

References

External links

1993 births
Living people
Ak Bars Kazan players
Atlant Moscow Oblast players
HC Neftekhimik Nizhnekamsk players
Russian ice hockey defencemen
Tatar people of Russia
Tatar sportspeople
Traktor Chelyabinsk players